Russ Abbot (born Russell Allan Roberts; 18 September 1947) is an English musician, comedian and actor. Born in Chester, he first came to public notice during the 1970s as the singer and drummer with British comedy showband the Black Abbots, later forging a prominent solo career as a television comedian with his own weekly show on British television.

Continuing his musical career as a solo artist, Abbot released several charting singles and albums. His career has continued with a shift into more mainstream serious acting in television shows, series, and stage productions.

Career
As a drummer/backing singer, Abbot joined the Black Abbots (founded by Robert Turner) in Chester during the mid-1960s and they released several singles to modest chart success on minor labels in the early 1970s. The band only signed their first major recording contract in 1977, putting out a series of comedy singles and one live album (Abbot now taking lead vocals) before disbanding in 1980. Subsequently, he appeared as a comedian, winning the 'Funniest Man On Television' award five times. Abbot appeared on the television show The Comedians under his birth name (Russ Roberts). From 1980 onward, he released some albums as a solo artist and appeared in several TV series. The most successful of his music singles, "Atmosphere", did well in the UK top 10, peaking at No. 7 in 1985.

Russ Abbot's Madhouse and The Russ Abbot Show showcased his talents as an all-round entertainer, attracting millions of viewers. This show was top-rated among younger viewers, prompting two annuals to be published in 1982–83. These annuals featured comic strips based on popular characters, plus some publicity photos of Abbot in a variety of guises, including his well-known James Bond satire featuring characters named Basildon Bond and Miss Funnyfanny (based on the fictional MI6 spy duo James Bond and Miss Moneypenny).

In January 1993, Abbot hosted an Elvis special of Stars in Their Eyes; this was originally to be presented by Leslie Crowther, who had suffered serious injuries in a car crash in his Rolls-Royce in October 1992. Abbot was brought in as a temporary host, and this was the only episode he hosted. Crowther was unable to return, and died in 1996; he was replaced by Matthew Kelly, who then hosted the show until 2004.

From 2000, Abbot played the lead role in the British National Tour of Doctor Dolittle. Taking a break over the Christmas period, Abbot stepped down for Phillip Schofield to take the part but returned to the tour subsequently. In 2003, his "See You Jimmy" character (called C. U. Jimmy) came third in the Glasgow Herald's poll to find the most Scottish person in the world, behind Iain and Jimmy Krankie.

Abbot's theatre roles include Alfred P. Doolittle in My Fair Lady (starring Amy Nuttall) at the Theatre Royal, Drury Lane and on tour; The Narrator in The Rocky Horror Show; Grandpa Potts in Chitty Chitty Bang Bang at the London Palladium and Fagin in Oliver! both in 1998 and 2009.

From July 2007, he took over the role of Roger De Bris in the UK tour of Mel Brooks' The Producers. In 2008, Abbot appeared as the Tin Man in the stage production of The Wizard of Oz at the Mayflower Theatre, Southampton.

In 2008, the BBC announced that Abbot would be joining the cast of Last of the Summer Wine for the show's 30th series. He played Luther 'Hobbo' Hobdyke, who was the leader of a group consisting also of Entwistle, played by Burt Kwouk and Alvin, played by Brian Murphy.

In 2008, he guest-starred in The Sarah Jane Adventures episode "Secrets of the Stars" as a character called Martin Trueman, an astrologer who was possessed by the Ancient Lights. On 8 August 2009, Abbot appeared in an episode of Casualty playing a pet shop owner. This marked Abbot's second Casualty role – he previously appeared as a different character in a 1999 episode. He appeared on Harry Hill's TV Burp parodying the character he played in Casualty.

In 2009, when Rowan Atkinson fell ill during the original run of Cameron Mackintosh's West End revival of Oliver!, Abbot stepped into the role of Fagin for the second time. He again took the role after Griff Rhys Jones left the show on 12 June 2010.

Between 2014 and 2016 he co-starred in the BBC sitcom Boomers.

In December 2020, University Radio Nottingham presenters George Scotland and Damian Stephen decided to start an internet campaign to get "Atmosphere" to number one for Christmas. The campaign, in the style of previous internet campaigns for Rage Against The Machine and AC/DC (both of whom charted within the Top 5) was endorsed by Abbot as well as Paul Chuckle and Alistair Griffin, with "Atmosphere" highlighted as one of the contenders for Christmas Number One by the Official Charts Company.

Family
Abbot has been married to Patricia Simpson since 28 January 1966. The couple have four children.

Discography

Singles
 1980 – "Space Invaders Meet the Purple People Eater" / "Country Cooper Man"
 1982 – "A Day In The Life of Vince Prince" (UK No. 61, one week; re-entered at No. 75 two weeks later for one week)
 1984 – "Atmosphere" (UK No. 7, in the chart for thirteen weeks)
 1985 – "All Night Holiday" (UK No. 20, in the chart for seven weeks)
 1985 – "Let's Go To The Disco" (No UK chart placing)

Albums
 1984 – Russ Abbot's Madhouse
 1985 – I Love A Party – (UK No. 12)
 1990 – Songs Of Joy

Filmography
 1971 – The Comedians (television programme)
 1972 – Who Do You Do? (television programme)
 1976 – What's On Next? (television programme)
 1979 – The Freddie Starr Variety Madhouse (television programme)
 1980 – Russ Abbot's Madhouse (television programme)
 1982 – My Beard is My Lighthouse (radio show on BBC Radio 4)
 1986 – The Russ Abbot Show (television programme)
 1993 – Stars in Their Eyes – cover for Leslie Crowther (a one-off Elvis special)
 1993 – September Song (television programme)
 1996 – Married for Life (television programme)
 1999–2002 Dream Street (narrator)
 2000 – Heartbeat (television program); guest appearance, December 2000, single episode
 2001 – TV to Go (television programme)
 2003 – The Bill (television programme); guest appearance, single episode
 2003 – My Family (television programme); guest appearance, single episode
 2005 – Agatha Christie's Marple (television programme)
 2007 – Hotel Babylon (television programme) as Mr. Poldark, guest appearance, February 2007, single episode, in conjunction with Cherie Lunghi
 2007 – The Last Detective (television programme) guest appearance, May 2007, single episode, in conjunction with Roy Hudd
 2008 – The Sarah Jane Adventures  (television programme) Secrets of the Stars: Series 2 Episode 5
 2008–2010 – Last of the Summer Wine
 2009 – Casualty (television programme); guest appearance, November 2009, single episode
 2012 – Run for Your Wife (film); cameo role
 2014–2016 Boomers (television programme)

References

External links
 

1947 births
20th-century English comedians
21st-century English comedians
English male comedians
English male singers
English male television actors
English people of Scottish descent
English rock drummers
Male actors from Cheshire
Actors from Chester
Musicians from Cheshire
Living people
People educated at Chester City Grammar School
British male comedy actors
People from Ellesmere Port